The Dheune is a 71 km long river running through the Côte-d'Or and Saône-et-Loire departments of France. It flows into the Saône at Allerey-sur-Saône.

References

Dheune
Rivers of Bourgogne-Franche-Comté
Rivers of Côte-d'Or